The Battle of Cumae is the name given to at least two battles between Cumae and the Etruscans:

 In 524 BC an invading army of Umbrians, Daunians, Etruscans, and others were defeated by the Greeks of Cumae. 

 The naval battle in 474 BC was between the combined navies of Syracuse and Cumae against the Etruscans.

The Greek-colonised city of Cumae in southern Italy was founded in 8th century BC in an area towards the southern Etruscan border. 

By 504 the southern Etruscans were defeated by the Cumaeans, but they still maintained a powerful force. In 474 they were able to raise a fleet to launch a direct attack on Cumae.

In the naval battle, after he was called on for military assistance, Hiero I of Syracuse allied with naval forces from the maritime Greek cities of southern Italy to defend against Etruscan expansion into southern Italy. In 474, they met and defeated the Etruscan fleet at Cumae in the Bay of Naples. After their defeat, the Etruscans lost much of their political influence in Italy. They lost control of the sea and their territories were eventually taken over by the Romans, Samnites, and Gauls. The Syracusans dedicated a captured Etruscan helmet at the great panhellenic sanctuary at Olympia, a piece of armour found in the German excavations there. The Etruscans would later join the failed Athenian expedition against Syracuse in 415 BC, which contributed even further to their decline.

The battle was later honored in Pindar's first Pythian Ode.

References

470s BC conflicts
Cumae
Cumae
Cumae
474 BC
Cumae (ancient city)